An alvar is a kind of biological environment poor in soil.

Alvar or Alvars may also refer to:
 Alvar (given name)
 Álvar Núñez Cabeza de Vaca, a Spanish explorer of the New World
 Alvar, Armenia, a village in Armenia
 Alvar, Iran (disambiguation), any of a number of places in Iran
 Alvars, a collection of Tamil saints
 "Alvar", a song from Tales of Us, by Goldfrapp
 Alvar (resin), a polyvinyl-acetyl resin